Robert Bower "Buzz" Peterson Jr. (born May 17, 1963) is an American basketball executive who is the assistant general manager for the Charlotte Hornets of the National Basketball Association (NBA). He has also coached college basketball, most recently as the head coach of the UNC Wilmington Seahawks men's basketball team.  He was fired by UNC Wilmington at the conclusion of the 2014 season.  Peterson was the head coach of the Tennessee Volunteers basketball team for four years before being fired in 2005. He previously coached a second stint at Appalachian State—he coached the 2009–10 Mountaineers, as well as the 1996 to 2000 squads. Previously, he was the men's basketball head coach at the University of Tulsa and at Coastal Carolina University, a position he held until mid-2007, when he left the program to be executive (Director of Player Personnel) with the Charlotte Bobcats of the NBA.

Peterson, a standout at Asheville High School, was named the 1981 high school player of the year in North Carolina over Michael Jordan. He was named both a McDonald's and Parade All-American. He played basketball for Dean Smith at University of North Carolina at Chapel Hill where he was a roommate of Jordan, who later was best man at Peterson's wedding. Peterson was a member of the Tar Heels team that won the 1982 national championship. He was later drafted in 1985 by the Cleveland Cavaliers in the seventh round of that year's NBA draft, but chose to play overseas.

In his first stint as head coach at Appalachian State, he led the Mountaineers to the Southern Conference Tournament Championship during the 1999–2000 season. During his single season at Tulsa, 2000–01, Peterson led the Golden Hurricane to their second NIT championship.

Peterson was a special adviser to basketball operations for the Charlotte Hornets in 2016–17. In June 2017, he was promoted to assistant general manager. In 2018, Peterson became the interim general manager for the Hornets when Rich Cho was fired by the team. The position was permanently filled near the end of the season by former Los Angeles Lakers general manager Mitch Kupchak.

Head coaching record

References

1963 births
Living people
American men's basketball coaches
American men's basketball players
Appalachian State Mountaineers men's basketball coaches
Basketball coaches from North Carolina
Basketball players from North Carolina
Charlotte Hornets executives
Cleveland Cavaliers draft picks
Coastal Carolina Chanticleers men's basketball coaches
College men's basketball head coaches in the United States
East Tennessee State Buccaneers men's basketball coaches
McDonald's High School All-Americans
NC State Wolfpack men's basketball coaches
North Carolina Tar Heels men's basketball players
Parade High School All-Americans (boys' basketball)
Sportspeople from Asheville, North Carolina
Tennessee Volunteers basketball coaches
Tulsa Golden Hurricane men's basketball coaches
UNC Wilmington Seahawks men's basketball coaches
Vanderbilt Commodores men's basketball coaches